Bagster  may refer to:

Samuel Bagster (disambiguation), several people
Josiah Howell Bagster (1847–1893) South Australian politician
Dr. George Bagster Phillips (1835–1897) Police Surgeon involved in Jack the Ripper investigation
A French manufacturer of motorcycle equipment